Misasa Dam is an earthfill dam located in Tottori prefecture in Japan. The dam is used for power production. The catchment area of the dam is 24.2 km2. The dam impounds about 1  ha of land when full and can store 33 thousand cubic meters of water. The construction of the dam was started on 1956 and completed in 1958.

References

Dams in Tottori Prefecture
1958 establishments in Japan